James BeauSeigneur (born 1953) is an American novelist. He is a former intelligence analyst who has worked for the National Security Agency and the Defense Intelligence Agency. As an author, he has worked with the Department of Homeland Security by serving on “Terrorist Red Cells” to speculate on possible terrorist targets and tactics. He is a former newspaper publisher, and he taught political science for two years at the University of Tennessee in Knoxville. His background brings a special focus on scientific and political realism to his novels, which are heavily footnoted. His Christ Clone Trilogy has been published in 12 languages.

Biography 

James BeauSeigneur was born in Waltham, Massachusetts in 1953. At age six, he became interested in Christian eschatology.

He served in the United States Army from 1976 to 1981, being assigned as a National Security Agency intelligence analyst.

He ran in 1980 for the United States Congress as the Republican nominee against Al Gore, but left politics for a more stable family life. He wrote in the technical and fiction sector for regular income and creativity. His religious awakening started in the 1970s with the Jesus freak movement, and he writes in hopes of attracting non-Christian readers.

He has written numerous newspaper and magazine articles, including Military Avionics in 1985 and Strategic Defense the following year. He has also written lyrics for published songs.

He is now a writing consultant to the U.S. government and is currently consulting with several Fortune 500 companies in support of their marketing efforts to government customers as well as working on a biography collection.

Personal life
BeauSeigneur married Geri in 1974. He has two daughters, Abigail and Faith BeauSeigneur, and four grandchildren.

Bibliography

The Christ Clone Trilogy
In His Image, Warner Books, 2003, 
Birth of an Age, Warner Books, 2003, 
Acts of God, Warner Faith. 2004. .

References

External links 
Facebook page
2012 Interview: James BeauSeigneur
Interview: James BeauSeigneur
"A Review of James BeauSeigneur's The Christ Clone Trilogy", Jay Carper
"Book Review - Acts of God by James BeauSeigneur", Duffbert's Random Musings

1953 births
Living people
21st-century American novelists
University of Tennessee faculty
Christian novelists
American male novelists
20th-century American novelists
20th-century American male writers
21st-century American male writers
Novelists from Tennessee